Year 1095 (MXCV) was a common year starting on Monday (link will display the full calendar) of the Julian calendar.

Events 
 By place 

 Byzantine Empire 
 March – Emperor Alexios I (Komnenos) send envoys to Pope Urban II, at the Council of Piacenza, and appeals to the Christian states of Western Europe for military aid against the Seljuk Turks. Urban responds favourably, hoping to heal the Great Schism of 40 years earlier, and to reunite the Catholic Church under papal primacy by helping the Eastern churches.
 Summer – The nomadic Cumans cross the Danube River and invade Thrace, to support the pretender Constantine Diogenes (son of the late Emperor Romanos IV). The Cumans occupy the province of Paristrion (located in the Lower Danube). Emperor Alexios I places Byzantine detachments to guard the passes over the Balkan Mountains, but they are bypassed.

 Europe 

 The Second County of Portugal is established by Count Henry of Burgundy. The Almoravids start pushing back the forces of King Alfonso VI (the Brave) to the positions they occupied a decade earlier. This offensive begins with the re-conquest of Lisbon, which had been given away to Castile (see 1091).
 July – Coloman (the Learned) begins to establish himself as ruler of Hungary, following the death of his uncle, King Ladislaus I (until 1116). 
 August 18 – King Olaf I (Hunger) dies after a 9-year reign. He is succeeded by his brother Eric I (the Good) as ruler of Denmark. 

 England 
 After attacking four Norwegian merchant ships (lying in the River Tyne), Robert Mowbray, earl of Northumberland, is called for by King William II (the Red) to explain his actions. Instead, Mowbray rises up in rebellion against William along with other Norman nobles. William leads an army and besieges Bamburgh Castle, Mowbray is captured after fleeing the stronghold.

 By topic 

 Religion 
 November 18 – The Council of Clermont begins. The synod is called by Pope Urban II to discuss sending the First Crusade to the Holy Land.
 November 27 – Urban II preaches the First Crusade at the Council of Clermont; Peter the Hermit begins to preach throughout France.
 November 28 – Urban II appoints Bishop Adhemar of Le Puy and Count Raymond IV (Saint-Gilles), to lead the First Crusade.
 The Valence Cathedral is consecrated in Valence (approximate date).

Births 
 July 4 – Usama ibn Munqidh, Arabian diplomat and poet (d. 1188)
 December 22 – Roger II, king of Sicily (d. 1154)
 Amadeus III, count of Savoy and Maurienne (d. 1148)
 Fujiwara no Taishi, Japanese empress (d. 1156)
 Geoffrey of Monmouth, English historian (d. 1155)
 Hériman of Tournai, French chronicler (d. 1147)
 Hugh Bigod, English nobleman and advisor (d. 1177)
 Hugh Candidus, English monk and historian (d. 1160)
 Kōgyō-Daishi, Japanese Buddhist priest (d. 1143)
 Robert Fitzharding, English nobleman (d. 1170)
 Ulvhild Håkansdotter, Swedish queen (d. 1148)
 Victor IV (Octavian), antipope of Rome (d. 1164)
 William II, duke of Apulia and Calabria (d. 1127)
 William of Malmesbury, English historian (d. 1143)
 Zishou Miaozong, Chinese Zen master (d. 1170)

Deaths 
 January 20 – Wulfstan, bishop of Worcester
 March 5 – Judith of Flanders, duchess of Bavaria
 June 18 – Sophia of Hungary, duchess of Saxony
 June 26 – Robert the Lotharingian, bishop of Hereford
 July 29 – Ladislaus I, king of Hungary 
 August 18 – Olaf I (Hunger), king of Denmark
 October 12 – Leopold II, margrave of Austria (b. 1050)
 November 22 – Donngus Ua hAingliu, Irish bishop
 Agapetus of Pechersk, Kievan monk and doctor
 Al-Humaydī, Andalusian scholar and writer (b. 1029)
 Ali ibn Faramurz, Kakuyid emir of Yazd and Abarkuh
 Al-Mu'tamid ibn Abbad, Abbadid emir of Seville (b. 1040)
 Gerald of Sauve-Majeure, French Benedictine abbot
 Godred Crovan, Norse-Gaelic king of Dublin
 Henry of Laach, German count palatine of the Rhine
 Robert, 2nd Earl of Cornwall (approximate date)
 Ruben I (or Rupen), prince of Armenia (b. 1025)
 Shen Kuo, Chinese polymath scientist and engineer (b. 1031)
 Tutush I, Seljuk emir of Damascus and Aleppo
 Vitale Faliero (or Falier de' Doni), doge of Venice
 William I, count of Cerdanya and Berga

References